House of the Black Death is a 1965 American horror film directed by Harold Daniels, Reginald LeBorg and Jerry Warren. The film was written by Richard Mahoney, based on a novel titled The Widderburn Horror by Lora Crozetti. The film is about two elderly brothers who are warlocks, Belial (Lon Chaney Jr.) and Andre (John Carradine), who have been feuding with each other for years over the family estate. Belial, who sports small goat's horns on his forehead, has been using his black magic to bewitch members of the family, while Andre spends the entire film bedridden. The two actors did not share any scenes in the film.

Plot summary 

Two elderly brothers who are warlocks, Belial (Lon Chaney Jr.) and Andre (John Carradine), have been feuding with each other for years over the family estate. Belial, who sports small goat's horns on his forehead and runs a coven of witches, has been using his black magic to bewitch members of the family, while Andre spends the entire film bedridden. Andre keeps warning people that his brother Belial is evil and up to no good. Belial turns Andre's son into a werewolf by way of a magical spell and bewitches Andre's daughter (Serena) into dancing and gyrating sensuously. Much of the plot involves scenes of the sexy witches belly-dancing in front of their satanic altar.

Cast 
Lon Chaney Jr. as Belial Desard
John Carradine as Andre Desard
Andrea King as Dr. Katherine Mallory
Tom Drake as Paul Dessard
Dolores Faith as Valerie Dessard
Sabrina as Belly-dancer
Jerome Thor as Dr. Eric Campion
Sherwood Keith
Catherine Petty
George Mitchell
Katherine Victor as Lila
Margaret Shinn

Production

The film was originally to be titled Night of the Beast or The Widderburn Horror, but it was theatrically released as Blood of the Man Devil. When it was later released to television, the title was again changed to House of the Black Death. Although the film was made in 1965, when most new films were being made in color, it was shot in black-and-white for $70,000.

Harold Daniels shot the film initially in 1965 with actors Chaney and Carradine, and Reginald LeBorg co-directed in an uncredited capacity.  Reginald LeBorg claimed he did very little directing actually. He said his work "consisted of little more than some shots of actors wandering around amongst the trees in the forest scenes."

Afterwards, the producers felt the film needed something more, so Jerry Warren was hired to add some extra footage to pad out the running time and edit the film. Warren brought Katherine Victor into the project, casting her as the leader of a coven of witches. Jerry Warren said "They had a terrible mishmash of a movie. It's wasn't a movie, it was a bunch of film. It came out bad but it came out playable, and it did pull out some money for the people who made it".

Critical response

Fred Olen Ray claims to have seen the film under the title Blood of the Man Devil "in the drive-in in the early 1970s on a quintuple "Blood" bill with Blood Mania and three other films. The fact that the film was made in black and white might have had something to do with its distribution difficulties."

James O'Neill wrote "Cardboard monstrosity culled from footage contributed by three different directors....Most of the veteran cast look sick or drunk, or both".  Stephen Jones called it "an incomprehensible mess....with plenty of gratuitous belly-dancing".

See also
List of American films of 1965

References

External links

1965 films
1965 horror films
American black-and-white films
Films based on American novels
Films directed by Jerry Warren
Satanism in popular culture
American werewolf films
Films about witchcraft
1960s English-language films
1960s American films